Charles I of Baden (1427 – 24 February 1475, Pforzheim) was a Margrave of Baden-Baden during 1454–1475.

Charles was the elder son of Jacob, Margrave of Baden-Baden, and his wife Catherine, daughter of Charles II, Duke of Lorraine. In 1462 he became involved in the Bavarian War (1459–63) against Frederick I, Elector Palatine. This war finished in the same year with Charles's defeat and capture at the Battle of Seckenheim.

Family and children
On 1 July 1447, he married Catherine of Austria (1423 – 11 September 1493), daughter of Archduke Ernest the Iron. They had six children:
 Katharina (15 January 1449 – before 8 May 1484), married on 19 May 1464 to Count George III of Werdenberg-Sargans
 Zimburg (15 May 1450 – 5 July 1501), married on 19 December 1468 to Count Engelbert II of Nassau-Dillenburg
 Margareta (1452–1495), Abbess in Lichtenthal
 Christopher I, Margrave of Baden-Baden (13 November 1453 – 19 April 1527)
 Albert, Margrave of Baden-Hachberg (1456–1488)
 Frederick (9 July 1458 – 24 September 1517), Bishop of Utrecht

External links and references
  Article in the ADB

Margraves of Baden-Baden
1427 births
Baden-Baden, Charles I of
House of Zähringen